In enzymology, a glucuronolactone reductase is an enzyme that catalyzes the chemical reaction

L-gulono-1,4-lactone + NADP+  D-glucurono-3,6-lactone + NADPH + H+

Thus, the two substrates of this enzyme are L-gulono-1,4-lactone and NADP+, whereas its 3 products are D-glucurono-3,6-lactone, NADPH, and H+.

This enzyme belongs to the family of oxidoreductases, specifically those acting on the CH-OH group of donor with NAD+ or NADP+ as acceptor. The systematic name of this enzyme class is L-gulono-1,4-lactone:NADP+ 1-oxidoreductase. Other names in common use include GRase, and gulonolactone dehydrogenase.  This enzyme participates in ascorbate and aldarate metabolism.

References

 

EC 1.1.1
NADPH-dependent enzymes
Enzymes of unknown structure